David Goldstein (born February 24, 1947), better known as Rupert Holmes, is a British-American composer, singer-songwriter, dramatist and author. He is widely known for the hit singles "Escape (The Piña Colada Song)" (1979) and "Him" (1980). He is also known for his musicals The Mystery of Edwin Drood, which earned him two Tony Awards, and Curtains, and for his television series Remember WENN.

Life and career
Holmes was born David Goldstein in Northwich, Cheshire, England. His father, Leonard Eliot Goldstein, was a United States Army warrant officer and bandleader. His mother, Gwendolen Mary (née Pynn), was English, and both were musical. Holmes has dual British and American citizenship. The family moved when Holmes was six years old to the northern New York City suburb of Nanuet, New York, where Holmes grew up and attended nearby Nyack High School and then the Manhattan School of Music (majoring in clarinet). Holmes's brother, Richard, is the principal lyric baritone of the New York Gilbert and Sullivan Players, sings roles with regional opera companies, such as Glimmerglass, Lake George and Virginia Opera, and has appeared with the Metropolitan Opera.

In 1969, Holmes married childhood friend Elizabeth "Liza" Wood Dreifuss, an attorney. Their daughter Wendy died suddenly in 1986, at the age of ten, of an undiagnosed brain tumor. They have two sons, Nick, a filmmaker, and Timothy, who is autistic. In 2009, they moved from Scarsdale, New York, where they had lived since Wendy's death, to Cold Spring, New York.

Songwriter and recording artist
In his 20s, Holmes was a session musician (producing sessions, writing and arranging songs, singing and playing a few instruments). In 1969, Holmes and Ron Dante (the Cuff Links, the Archies) recorded "Jennifer Tomkins" for release on their second album, The Cuff Links.  During the recording of that album, Dante was prohibited by the studio that produced the Archies from any involvement in new recording ventures and was forced to drop out of The Cuff Links.  Holmes finished the project and released "Jennifer Tomkins" separately under a different studio name, Street People (not related to the mid-1970s band of the same name). The song was on the Billboard Hot 100 for 15 weeks, beginning January 3, 1970, reaching a peak of 36.  A follow-up single called "Thank You Girl" reached 96 on the Billboard pop charts in April 1970.

Holmes played the piano for both the Cuff Links and the Buoys, with whom he had his first international hit, "Timothy", which was on the Hot 100 for 17 weeks beginning on January 2, 1971, a No. 17 song about cannibalism that intentionally drew controversy. He also wrote "Give Up Your Guns" (which peaked at No. 84), "The Prince of Thieves", "Blood Knot", and "Tomorrow" for the band.  Holmes also wrote jingles and pop tunes (including for Gene Pitney, the Platters, the Drifters, Wayne Newton, Dolly Parton, Barry Manilow and television's the Partridge Family), as well as the score of the 1970 revenge western, Five Savage Men (also known as The Animals), which starred Keenan Wynn.

As a recording artist, Holmes broke through with his first album, 1974's Widescreen on Epic Records, which introduced him as a presenter of highly romantic, lushly orchestrated "story songs" that told a witty narrative punctuated by clever rhymes and a hint of comedy. Barbra Streisand discovered this album and asked to record songs from it, launching Holmes on a successful career. She then used some of his songs in the movie A Star Is Born. Holmes also arranged, conducted, and wrote songs on her 1975 album Lazy Afternoon as well as five other Streisand albums. Holmes's second, self-titled album led Rolling Stone to compare him with Bob Dylan in the sense of being an artist of unprecedented originality that commanded attention.

Holmes's production skills were also in demand during this period, and he took on this role for Lynsey de Paul on her album Tigers and Fireflies, which spawned the radio hit "Hollywood Romance". The album also featured the bluesy song "'Twas", co-written by Holmes and de Paul. He additionally produced Sparks' 1976 LP, Big Beat, though the album was not a success. In 1975, together with Jeffrey Lesser, Holmes produced the UK band Sailor's album Trouble (CBS Epic).

"Escape (The Piña Colada Song)" was included on Holmes's fifth album, Partners in Crime, and was the final Hot 100 No. 1 of 1979.  Another popular song on that album was "Him", which peaked at number 6 on the Hot 100.  He had another top-40 hit with "Answering Machine".  In 1986, Holmes's composition "You Got It All" (sometimes called "You Got It All Over Him") was a top 3 hit single for The Jets and was later recorded by pop superstar Britney Spears and featured in her internationally released version of Oops!... I Did It Again (2000). He also produced two songs for singer Judy Collins that appeared on her album Sanity and Grace. His song "The People That You Never Get to Love" was featured on four albums by Susannah McCorkle The People That You Never Get to Love (1981), From Bessie to Brazil (1993), Most Requested Songs (2001), and Ballad Essentials (2002). Frank Sinatra Jr. also recorded the tune on his That Face! album (2006).

In the 1980s and 1990s, Holmes also played in cabarets and comedy clubs, mostly in New York City, telling often autobiographical anecdotes illustrated with his songs. In a 2016 episode of the TV show Better Call Saul, Jimmy says that he is making a documentary about Holmes and sings part of "Escape". In 2021, Holmes received an honorary Doctor of Musical Arts degree from Manhattan School of Music.

Playwright
Holmes made his professional debut as a playwright with the musical The Mystery of Edwin Drood in 1985. He was encouraged to write a musical by Joseph Papp and his wife after they attended one of Holmes's cabarets in 1983. The result, loosely based on the Charles Dickens unfinished novel of the same name, and inspired by Holmes's memories of English pantomime shows he attended as a child, was a hit in New York's Central Park and on Broadway.  Because Dickens left the novel unfinished at his death, Holmes employed the unusual device of providing alternate endings for each character who is suspected of the murder, and letting the audience vote on a different murderer each night. The show earned Holmes the Tony Award for both book and score, as well as the Drama Desk Awards for lyrics, music, the book and orchestrations, among various other honors. The musical has been given London and Broadway revivals, among others. The success of Drood would lead Holmes to write other plays (both musical and non-) in later years, though he has stated that he avoided musical theater for some time after the death of his daughter.

Holmes also wrote the Tony Award-nominated ("Best Play 2003") Say Goodnight, Gracie, based on the relationship between George Burns and Gracie Allen. The play, which starred Frank Gorshin, was that Broadway season's longest running play and the third longest-running solo-performance show in Broadway history. He wrote the comedy-thriller Accomplice in 1990, which was the second of Holmes's plays to receive an Edgar Award (following Drood). Holmes has written a number of other shows, including Solitary Confinement, which played on Broadway at the Nederlander Theatre in 1992 and set a new Kennedy Center box office record before its Broadway run; Thumbs, the most successful play in the history of the Helen Hayes Theatre Company; and the musical Marty (2002), starring John C. Reilly. He wrote the book to Swango: The Theatrical Dance Experience, a swing-tango dance piece that premiered Off-Broadway in 2002 inspired by Romeo and Juliet. It has had several revivals. Holmes joined the creative team of the musical Curtains after the deaths of both Peter Stone (the original book-writer) and Fred Ebb (the lyricist). Holmes rewrote Stone's original book and contributed additional lyrics to the Kander and Ebb songs. Curtains played at the Al Hirschfeld Theatre on Broadway, and David Hyde Pierce and Debra Monk starred in the lead roles. Holmes and Peter Stone (posthumously) won the 2007 Drama Desk Award for Outstanding Book of a Musical for Curtains.

Holmes wrote the book of the musical The First Wives' Club, adapted from the film of the same name. The musical premiered at The Old Globe Theater in San Diego, California in 2009. Its score is by Lamont Dozier, Brian Holland and Eddie Holland. The production received generally unenthusiastic reviews but sold well. A new book was written by Linda Bloodworth-Thomason, and the reworked show opened in Chicago in 2015. Holmes next wrote the book for a jukebox musical, Robin and the 7 Hoods, inspired by the 1964 film of the same name starring Frank Sinatra, with a new story line that Holmes set in the Mad Men era of 1962. Songs are by Sammy Cahn and Jimmy Van Heusen, including "My Kind of Town". A production ran in 2010, also at the Old Globe. Casey Nicholaw directed and choreographed. The story is about a likable gangster hoping to get out of the crime business. A do-gooding TV reporter likens him to a modern-day Robin Hood.

Holmes adapted the John Grisham novel and film of A Time to Kill for the stage. The play premiered at the Arena Stage, Washington, DC, in 2011. The courtroom drama, set against a background of evolving 1980s Southern racial politics, was called "funny, shocking, witty, and sly". He wrote the book and lyrics for The Nutty Professor, a musical based on the 1963 film of the same name. Marvin Hamlisch wrote the score. The musical was directed by Jerry Lewis and premiered in Nashville, Tennessee, in 2012. With Hamlisch, he also wrote songs for the 2013 Liberace biopic Behind the Candelabra. He next wrote the book of Secondhand Lions: A New Musical, which premiered in Seattle, Washington, in 2013. A Time to Kill was produced on Broadway, but lasted only four weeks plus previews, closing on November 17, 2013. In 2016, The Sweet Potato Queens, with music by Melissa Manchester, lyrics by Sharon Vaughn and a book by Holmes premiered at TUTS Underground.

Television writer and novelist
In 1996, Holmes created the television series Remember WENN for American Movie Classics, writing the theme song and all 56 episodes of that series. In 2003, he published his first novel, Where the Truth Lies (later adapted into a film of the same name by Atom Egoyan), followed in 2005 by Swing, a multimedia release combining a novel with a music CD providing clues to the mystery. His next novel, The McMasters Guide to Homicide: Murder Your Employer, is scheduled for release in 2023.

Discography

Albums
This discography does not include others' collections or albums released without Holmes's participation.

Holmes also wrote and co-produced, and was a keyboardist on, the songs on the disco album Shobizz, released in 1979 by Capitol Records. He also featured as a vocalist on the 1983 album Lake Freeze - The Raccoons Songtrack by The Raccoons.

Singles

Other works

Theatre

The Mystery of Edwin Drood
Twelfth Night
Accomplice
The Hamburger Hamlet
Solitary Confinement
Goosebumps
Say Goodnight, Gracie
Thumbs
Marty
Curtains
Swango
 A Time to Kill
The Picture of Dorian Gray
The First Wives' Club
Robin and the 7 Hoods
The Nutty Professor
Secondhand Lions: A New Musical
The Sweet Potato Queens

Film and television
Remember WENN
Hi Honey I'm Home
No Small Affair
Five Savage Men
A Star Is Born
Art in Heaven
The Christmas Raccoons (voice)
Memories Within Miss Aggie

Books
Where the Truth Lies
Swing
The McMasters Guide to Homicide: Murder Your Employer

Notes

References
Gordon, Meryl. "Escape From Piña Coladaville", New York Magazine interview (August 11, 2003), pp. 42–45, 88
Gilbert Gottfried Amazing Colossal Podcast, interview (2017)

External links

1947 births
Living people
21st-century American novelists
21st-century British novelists
American musical theatre composers
American musical theatre lyricists
Broadway composers and lyricists
American television writers
English musical theatre composers
English television writers
American male television writers
English songwriters
Edgar Award winners
Elektra Records artists
Epic Records artists
MCA Records artists
Manhattan School of Music alumni
Musicians from New York (state)
Musicians from Cheshire
People from Cheshire
People from Northwich
People from Scarsdale, New York
Tony Award winners
People from Nanuet, New York
American male novelists
British soft rock musicians
English rock musicians
English male novelists
British emigrants to the United States
Songwriters from New York (state)
21st-century American short story writers
21st-century American male writers
21st-century British short story writers
21st-century English male writers
Novelists from New York (state)
Screenwriters from New York (state)
Writers from Cheshire
21st-century American screenwriters
21st-century British screenwriters
Nyack High School alumni